The Famous Five is a British television series based on the children's book series of the same name by Enid Blyton. It was first broadcast on Tyne-Tees and Harlech Television (HTV) from 10 September 1995 onwards, and on CITV (the children's strand of ITV) from 1 July 1996 onwards; there were two series between 1995 and 1997, produced by Zenith North and Tyne Tees in 26 twenty-five-minute episodes.

Cast
Jemima Rooper as George 
Marco Williamson as Julian
Paul Child as Dick
Laura O'Bree (née Petela) as Anne 
Elsie Kelly as Joan
Christopher Good as Uncle Quentin 
Mary Waterhouse as Aunt Frances

Episodes

First series
The first series was shown on HTV and Tyne Tees.
 
Five on a Treasure Island (part 1) (10 September 1995)
Five on a Treasure Island (part 2) (17 September 1995)
Five Get into Trouble (24 September 1995)
Five Go Adventuring Again (1 October 1995)
Five Fall into Adventure (8 October 1995)
Five Go to Demon's Rocks (15 October 1995)
Five on Kirrin Island Again (22 October 1995)
Five on Finniston Farm (29 October 1995)
Five Go Off to Camp (5 November 1995)
Five Have Plenty of Fun (12 November 1995)
Five on a Secret Trail (19 November 1995)
Five Go to Smuggler's Top (part 1) (26 November 1995)
Five Go to Smuggler's Top (part 2) (3 December 1995)

Second series
The second series was initially shown on HTV.

Five Go Down to the Sea (part 1) (10 November 1996)
Five Go Down to the Sea (part 2) (17 November 1996)
Five Run Away Together (24 November 1996)
Five Have a Mystery to Solve (1 December 1996)
Five Go to Mystery Moor (8 December 1996)
Five (Go) On a Hike Together (15 December 1996)
Five Have a Wonderful Time (part 1) (5 January 1997)
Five Have a Wonderful Time (part 2) (12 January 1997)
Five Go Off in a Caravan (19 January 1997)
Five Get into a Fix (26 January 1997)
Five Are Together Again (2 February 1997)
Five Go to Billycock Hill (part 1) (9 February 1997)
Five Go to Billycock Hill (part 2) (16 February 1997)

References

External links 
BFI.org (British Film Institute (BFI) listing)
Epguides.com Famous Five subsite (please note: refers to the second airing on ITV)

1990s British children's television series
British children's adventure television series
ITV children's television shows
British television shows based on children's books
1995 British television series debuts
1997 British television series endings
Adaptations of works by Enid Blyton
Television series by ITV Studios
English-language television shows
Television shows produced by Harlech Television (HTV)
Television shows produced by Tyne Tees Television
1990s British mystery television series